This is a list of Scottish football transfers featuring at least one 2013–14 Scottish Premiership club or one 2013–14 Scottish Championship club which were completed after the end of the summer 2013 transfer window and before the end of the 2013–14 season.

September 2013 – May 2014

See also
 List of Scottish football transfers summer 2013
 List of Scottish football transfers summer 2014

Notes

References

Transfers
Scottish
2013 in Scottish sport
2014 in Scottish sport
2013 winter